Bellefontaine Regional Airport  is three miles west of Bellefontaine, in Logan County, Ohio. It is a general aviation airport operated by Midwest Corporate Air under the auspices of the City of Bellefontaine and is accessible from State Route 47.

Most U.S. airports use the same three-letter location identifier for the FAA and IATA, Bellefontaine Regional Airport is EDJ to the FAA and has no IATA code.

The airport replaced an earlier airport, Bellefontaine Municipal Airport, four miles (6 km) northeast of the current airport (to the north of the city, near U.S. Route 68).  According to the AOPA, Bellefontaine Regional was, at its opening in 2002, only the second new airport to open in Ohio in the last 30 years.

For the last several years, Bellefontaine Regional has hosted an annual "Airfest" in late summer.

Facilities

The airport has fuel available. Planes can use tiedowns or hangars for parking.

In the year ending April 24, 2007 the airport had 8,325 aircraft operations, average 22 per day: 89% general aviation (7,425) and 11% air taxi (900). 31 aircraft are based at the airport: 87% single-engine, 10% multi-engine and 3% helicopter.

References

External links 

Buildings and structures in Logan County, Ohio
Airports in Ohio
Transportation in Logan County, Ohio
Bellefontaine, Ohio
2002 establishments in Ohio